Dmitri Sergeiyevich Voronkov (10 born September 2000) is a Russian ice hockey forward for Ak Bars Kazan of the Kontinental Hockey League (KHL).

Playing career
Voronkov made his KHL debut for Ak Bars Kazan during the 2018–19 KHL season, playing in three regular season games and one playoff game in February 2019. He was drafted 114th overall by the Columbus Blue Jackets in the 2019 NHL Entry Draft.

International play

 

 

On 23 January 2022, Voronkov was named to the roster to represent Russian Olympic Committee athletes at the 2022 Winter Olympics.

Career statistics

Regular season and playoffs

International

References

External links

2000 births
Living people
Ak Bars Kazan players
Columbus Blue Jackets draft picks
JHC Bars players
People from Angarsk
Russian ice hockey forwards
Yermak Angarsk players
Ice hockey players at the 2022 Winter Olympics
Medalists at the 2022 Winter Olympics
Olympic silver medalists for the Russian Olympic Committee athletes
Olympic medalists in ice hockey
Olympic ice hockey players of Russia
Sportspeople from Irkutsk Oblast